Kibiito is a town in the Western Region of Uganda. It is the chief administrative center of Bunyangabu District, and the district headquarters are located there.

Location
The geographical coordinates of Kibiito town are: 0°28'39.0"N, 30°11'33.0"E (Latitude:0.477500; Longitude:30.192500).

Population
The national census and household survey conducted in August 2014, enumerated the population of Kibiito Town Council at 12,984

Points of interest
The following points of interest are found in Kibiito or near its borders: (a) the headquarters of Bunyangabu District local government (b) the offices of Kibiito Town Council (c) Kiyimba central market (d) the Fort Portal–Kasese–Mpondwe Road passes through the middle of town in a general north to south direction (e) Kibiito Health Center.

References

External links
Bunyangabu District Interim Chairperson Calls for Teamwork
 Home National Musinguzi elected Bunyangabu interim chairperson

Populated places in Western Region, Uganda
Cities in the Great Rift Valley
Bunyangabu District
Toro sub-region